Forensic is an album by German jazz saxophonist Ingrid Laubrock, which was recorded in 2003 and released on the British F-IRE label, a musician-run company associated to the F-IRE Collective.

Reception

The All About Jazz review by Chris May states "Mysterious, moody and close to the edge, Forensic plays like a new take on the noir tradition. It's astringent and shadowy, like you'd expect from noir, but it's also visceral, hot and exhilarating, like you probably wouldn't. A new noir for a new world disorder."

In a review for The Guardian, John Fordham says "Some of the music is spookily dark and sepulchral, some of it delicately eccentric, some spun as slowly and symmetrically as a web, and the cello of Ben Davis is a constant source of both fresh melody and subtle timbres."

Track listing
All compositions by Ingrid Laubrock except 5, 8 & 10 which are free improvisations
 "Forensic Experts" – 4:00
 "Stone Lions" – 7:20
 "Monologue Man Pt I" – 2:01
 "Monologue Man Pt II" – 8:38
 "Us" – 4:49
 "Forensic" – 8:16
 "Clara" – 5:14
 "Stringding" – 6:06
 "Mirrors" – 7:45
 "BLT" – 12:28

Personnel
Ingrid Laubrock – soprano sax, alto sax, tenor sax, baritone sax, vocal on 10
Karim Merchant – piano
Ben Davis – cello
Larry Bartley – double bass
Tom Skinner – drums, bells
Julian Siegel – bass clarinet on 4

References

 

2005 albums
Ingrid Laubrock albums